Azerbaijan competed at the 2018 Winter Olympics in PyeongChang, South Korea, from 9 to 25 February 2018. The Azerbaijani team consisted of one male athlete competing in alpine skiing.

On January 22, 2018, alpine skier Patrick Brachner was named as the country's flag bearer during the opening ceremony.

Competitors
The following is the list of number of competitors participating in the Azerbaijani delegation per sport.

Alpine skiing 

Azerbaijan has qualified one male alpine skier, Austrian born skier Patrick Brachner. Brachner also represented the country four years prior at the 2014 Winter Olympics.

See also
Azerbaijan at the 2018 Summer Youth Olympics

References

Nations at the 2018 Winter Olympics
2018
2018 in Azerbaijani sport